Troissy is a commune in the Marne department in north-eastern France.

Sights and monuments
 Château de Troissy, 12th century castle. Its crypt was classified monument historique in 1924.
 Saint-Martin church, classified monument historique in 1911.
 Monument to the dead

See also
Communes of the Marne department

References

Communes of Marne (department)